Frederick IV of Germany may refer to:

Frederick III, Holy Roman Emperor (1415–1493), Holy Roman Emperor from 1452 until his death
Georg Friedrich, Prince of Prussia (born 1976), head of the Royal House of Hohenzollern, pretender to the German throne